Al-Magharb al-Sufla is a sub-district located in Manakhah District, Sana'a Governorate, Yemen. Al-Magharb al-Sufla had a population of 2080 according to the 2004 census.

References 

Sub-districts in Manakhah District